Below are the squads for the 21st Arabian Gulf Cup in Bahrain played in 2013. Caps and goals are correct prior to the tournament.

Group A

Bahrain
Coach:  Gabriel Calderón

Oman
Coach:  Paul Le Guen

Qatar
Coach:  Paulo Autuori

United Arab Emirates
Coach: Mahdi Ali

Group B

Iraq
Coach: Hakeem Shaker

Kuwait
Coach:  Goran Tufegdžić

Saudi Arabia
Head coach:  Frank Rijkaard

Yemen
Coach:  Tom Saintfiet

References

squads